The Theban Tomb TT46 is located in Sheikh Abd el-Qurna. It forms part of the Theban Necropolis, situated on the west bank of the Nile opposite Luxor.

TT46 was the burial place of the ancient Egyptian named Ramose, who was a Steward of the Mansion of the Aten and Overseer of the Granary of Upper and Lower Egypt. In the tomb, Ramose is further said to be an honoured one of Queen Ahmose Nefertari. Indeed, he bears the title First priest of Amun in Menset. Menst is the name of the mortuary temple of queen Ahmose Nefertari. Ramose dates to the time of Amenhotep III from the middle of the Eighteenth Dynasty of Egypt. Ramose's wife was named Nefertkha. Nefertkha was a singer of Hathor and a singer of Amun. Ramose was the steward of the Mansion of the Aten according to the inscriptions in his tomb, and this dates him to the reign of Akhenaten (Amenhotep IV).

See also
 List of Theban tombs

References

Theban tombs
Buildings and structures of the Eighteenth Dynasty of Egypt